Eosinophilic fasciitis, also known as Shulman's syndrome, is an inflammatory disease that affects the fascia, other connective tissues, surrounding muscles, blood vessels and nerves. Unlike other forms of fasciitis, eosinophilic fasciitis is typically self-limited and confined to the arms and legs, although it can require treatment with corticosteroids, and some cases are associated with aplastic anemia.

The condition was first characterized in 1974, but it is not yet known whether it is actually a distinct condition or merely a variant presentation of another syndrome. The presentation is similar to that of scleroderma or systemic sclerosis. However, unlike scleroderma, eosinophilic fasciitis affects the deeper fascial layers, rather than the dermis; the characteristic and severe effects of scleroderma and systemic sclerosis, such as Raynaud's syndrome, involvement of the extremities, prominent small blood vessels (telangiectasias), and visceral changes such as swallowing problems, are absent. Nevertheless, the term remains used for diagnostic purposes.

Signs and symptoms
Because the disease is rare and clinical presentations vary, a clear set of symptoms is difficult to define. Severe pain and swelling are often reported, and skin can resemble orange peel in appearance. Less common features include joint pain and carpal tunnel syndrome.

Cause
Most cases are idiopathic, but strenuous exercise, initiation of hemodialysis, infection with Borrelia burgdorferi, and certain medications, such as statins, phenytoin, ramipril, and subcutaneous heparin, may trigger the condition.

Diagnosis

The key to diagnosis is the observation of skin changes in combination with eosinophilia, but the most accurate test is a biopsy of skin, fascia, and muscle.

Treatment
Common treatments include corticosteroids such as prednisone, although medications such as hydroxychloroquine have also been used.
Early initiation of treatment usually portends a good prognosis if there is no visceral involvement.

Epidemiology
Typical age of onset is around forty  to fifty years, although cases in children have been observed. It remains unclear whether the condition is more common in women or men; patient numbers are small, and studies conflict in their reports of preponderance.

See also 
 Eosinophilia
 List of cutaneous conditions

References

Further reading

External links 

Disorders of fascia
Eosinophilic cutaneous conditions
Fasciitis, eosinophilic
Steroid-responsive inflammatory conditions
Systemic connective tissue disorders
Autoimmune diseases
Immune system disorders